Joseph J. McAneny (July 20, 1924 – February 19, 2007) was a Democratic member of the Pennsylvania House of Representatives.

References

Democratic Party members of the Pennsylvania House of Representatives
1924 births
2007 deaths
20th-century American politicians